XHPOP-FM is a radio station on 99.3 FM in Mexico City. The station is owned by Grupo ACIR and airs the company's Match format of contemporary hit radio in English.

History 
After initially being authorized as XEN-FM, a counterpart to XEN-AM 690, XHPOP was on the air by 1977. It initially broadcast an instrumental music format under the name Música Feliz 99 before changing to a hit radio format as Sonido 99 by the end of the decade.

The 1985 Mexico City earthquake severely damaged the studios used by XEN and its Ondas de Alegría sister stations, and after some time off the air and a relocation to new studios, the station reemerged as Radio Metrópoli and then Fórmula Mexicana, both broadcasting Mexican music. The station reverted to Sonido 99 at the end of 1987—a year in which the Díaz Romo cluster was split due to family differences—and soon changed to Digital 99.

In 1995, it was leased alongside ARTSA sister stations XHSH and XHDFM to Grupo ACIR for a period of 10 years, with the goal being to combine the stations to form new national network concepts. In 2005, the station was sold outright to Grupo ACIR.

Radio Disney 
In August 2013, the station stopped using the "Digital" name on-air, only referring to itself as "99-3". This sparked speculation about a format change, with Radio Disney as the main replacement option. This rumors were confirmed, when it was announced that on October 9, XHPOP-FM would become the Mexican version of Radio Disney, which officially launched at noon on that day. Most of the Digital hosts remained on Radio Disney.

Match 

On December 26, 2019, Disney and ACIR announced they were mutually ending their relationship, which had covered twelve Mexican cities. Ten of the twelve Radio Disney stations, including XHPOP, were transitioned to ACIR's replacement format, Match, which formally launched on January 7, 2020. Unlike Radio Disney, Match's programming is mostly composed of English-language hits from the 2000s to the present, with no Spanish hits and no Latin urban music.

References

External links
iheart Mexico City website

Radio stations in Mexico City
Grupo ACIR
Radio stations established in 1977